Ghetto Gastro is a New York based collective of chefs and food enthusiasts with deep ties to the Bronx that was formed in 2012. Members have included Jon Gray, Lester Walker, Marquis Hayes, Pierre Serrao and Malcolm Livingston II.

History 
Ghetto Gastro was founded in 2012 by John Gray, Lester Walker, Marquis Hayes, with chefs Malcolm Livingston II and Pierre Serrao joining the collective shortly after.

In March 2018 Ghetto Gastro collaborated with Marvel Studios to present "Taste of Wakanda" at New York Fashion Week, a food event which promoted the superhero film Black Panther.

In 2019 they opened the Labyrinth 1.1 space on the north shore of the Harlem River in the Bronx. The collective teamed up with the Bronx Oaxacan restaurant La Morada and the non-profit Rethink Food to distribute free meals to Black Lives Matter protesters during the George Floyd protests. By June 22, 2020, Ghetto Gastro had served 35,000 free meals, and announced that it planned to serve at least 75,000 meals.

References

External links
Ghetto Gastro official webpage

American artist groups and collectives
American chefs
Restaurants in New York City
African-American culture